Mount St Gwinear is  a mountain in Victoria, Australia, located at the north-east end of the Baw Baw National Park in the Gippsland high country.  It is popular with families looking for a cheap and accessible snow-play/tobogganing destination and cross-country skiers. The Baw Baw Plateau provides an abundance of easy touring terrain. Mount Baw Baw downhill ski village is approximately 9 km away across the Baw Baw plateau to the south-west and trails link the resorts.

Mount St Gwinear was named by the Geologist William Baragwanath after Saint Gwinear of Cornwall.  He also name the near by Mt St Phillack. Baragwanath was born in Ballarat of Cornish parents and many of the miners at the near by Walhalla gold mines were also Cornish.

See also

Alpine National Park
List of mountains in Victoria
Skiing in Victoria, Australia

References

External links
 Mount St Gwinear

Saint Gwinear